Zlatá Koruna is a municipality and village in Český Krumlov District in the South Bohemian Region of the Czech Republic. It has about 800 inhabitants.

Administrative parts
Villages of Plešovice and Rájov are administrative parts of Zlatá Koruna.

Sights
Zlatá Koruna is known for the Cistercian Zlatá Koruna Monastery. It was founded in 1263 by Ottokar II of Bohemia. It is one of the best preserved medieval monasteries in Bohemia.

See also
4408 Zlatá Koruna, an asteroid
Female Saint of Dolní Vltavice

References

Villages in Český Krumlov District